The 2004 FIFA Futsal World Championship was the fifth FIFA Futsal World Championship, the quadrennial international futsal championship contested by the men's national teams of the member associations of FIFA. It was held between 21 November and 5 December 2004 in Taiwan (Designated as Chinese Taipei under FIFA). It was the first FIFA tournament held in the country and was the last to feature 16 teams.

Spain won their second successive title, defeating Italy in the final.

Qualifying criteria

Qualified nations

Venues

First round
(21 November-26 November)

Group A

Group B

Group C

Group D

Second round
(28 November-1 December)

Group E

Group F

Final round

Semi-finals

Third-place match

Final

Champions

Top goalscorers
The top 10 scorers from the 2004 FIFA Futsal World Cup are as follows:

Tournament ranking

See also
 List of sporting events in Taiwan

References

External links
FIFA Futsal World Championship Chinese Taipei 2004, FIFA.com
FIFA Technical Report

 
FIFA Futsal World Cup
Fifa Futsal World Championship, 2004
Fifa Futsal World Championship, 2004
International futsal competitions hosted by Taiwan